Andrew Fagan (born 1962) is a New Zealand writer, singer-songwriter and long-distance solo sailor. He grew up in Wellington. He gained fame in New Zealand in the 1980s as the lead singer of the pop group The Mockers.

Following the success of The Mockers' 1985 hit "Forever Tuesday Morning", Fagan won the RIANZ 1985 award for Top Male Vocalist of the Year. Since The Mockers broke up, he has recorded and performed as a solo artist under the name Fagan (releasing his debut solo album Blisters in 1994); and with his band LIG. He has written two sailing-themed autobiographies, Swirly World, the Solo Voyages (2002) and Swirly World Sails South (2012), plus several collections of poetry. He has also been involved with the TVNZ Intrepid Journeys television series.

Fagan has lived in London and now resides in Auckland. He is married to the writer and television/radio broadcaster Karyn Hay. He co-hosted a talkback show with Hay on Radio Live from 7 pm to 10 pm on week nights from 2008 to 2015, with Hay continuing as a solo host until 2017. 

Fagan performs regular around New Zealand with his band Andrew Fagan and the People, including a seven-date North Island tour in April 2021. The band has released two critically praised albums; Admiral of the Narrow Seas (2011) and Act Normal (2020).

Discography

Albums

Singles

References

External links
"Jerusalem", by Andrew Fagan, 1994 music video, New Zealand Film Archive

1962 births
APRA Award winners
Living people
New Zealand pop singers